USS Laffey (DD-459) was a  of the United States Navy during World War II. She was the first destroyer named for Bartlett Laffey.

Laffey was laid down on 13 January 1941 by Bethlehem Shipbuilding Company, San Francisco, California; launched 30 October 1941; sponsored by Miss Eleanor G. Forgerty, granddaughter of Seaman Laffey; and commissioned on 31 March 1942, Lieutenant Commander William E. Hank in command. She was lost in action on 13 November 1942.

Service history 
After shakedown off the west coast, Laffey headed for the war zone via Pearl Harbor, arriving at Efate on 28 August 1942. She steamed in the antisubmarine screen until she joined Task Force 18 on 6 September. When the flagship— the aircraft carrier —was sunk on 15 September, Laffey rescued survivors and returned them to Espiritu Santo. She sailed with Task Force 64 and touched at Noumea, New Caledonia, on 18 September.

Laffey had her first fleet action in the Battle of Cape Esperance (also known as the Second Battle of Savo Island) on 11 and 12 October 1942. The destroyer operated with Admiral Norman Scott's cruiser group, guarding against enemy attempts to reinforce Guadalcanal. On 11 October, when the group formed into single column, Laffey joined two other destroyers in the van. About an hour later, sailors ran to their battle stations, steel doors clanged shut, and all made ready for battle. When the engagement began, Laffey raked the cruiser  with three of her 5-inch guns. The furious gunfire roared on through the night. At dawn, destroyer  was sinking,  was badly damaged, and cruiser , though hard hit, had weathered several powerful blows. However, the Japanese losses were even greater.  was sinking, Aoba was badly damaged, and  had sunk.

After the battle, Laffey met with a group escorting transports from Nouméa on 11 November, and sailed to Lunga Point, arriving the next day. The disembarking operations were interrupted by a heavy air attack. On 13 November, Laffey was placed in the van of a column of eight destroyers and five cruisers under Admiral Daniel J. Callaghan. Early in the midwatch, the radar operator reported contact with the enemy. The Naval Battle of Guadalcanal was just about to begin when the Japanese force, a group of two battleships, one light cruiser, and 14 destroyers, under Vice Admiral Hiroaki Abe, appeared on the horizon. Laffey lashed out at the enemy with gunfire and torpedoes. At the height of the violent battle, the battleship  came through the darkness and both ships headed at full speed for the same spot. Laffey unleashed her torpedoes and, using all her firepower, raked the battleship's bridge, wounding Admiral Abe, and killing his chief of staff. Admiral Abe was thereafter limited in his ability to direct his ships for the rest of the battle. With a battleship on her stern, a second on her port beam, and two destroyers on her port bow, Laffey fought the Japanese ships with the three remaining main battery guns in a no-quarter duel at point-blank range. She was hit by a 14-inch shell from Hiei. Then, a torpedo in her fantail put Laffey out of action. As the order to abandon ship was passed, a violent explosion ripped the destroyer apart and she sank immediately with heavy loss of life. This action earned her the Presidential Unit Citation.

Of the 247 crew members aboard, 59 were killed, including the commanding officer, William E. Hank. The wounded in the engagement numbered 116.

Awards 
Laffey was awarded the Presidential Unit Citation for her performance in the South Pacific, and three battle stars for service in World War II.

Service ribbons

References 

- Firsthand account of the first engagement of the battle by the captain of the Japanese destroyer .

External links 

USS Laffey website at Destroyer History Foundation
Roll of Honor

Further reading 

 

Benson-class destroyers
Ships built in San Francisco
1941 ships
World War II destroyers of the United States
Shipwrecks in Ironbottom Sound
Maritime incidents in November 1942
1992 archaeological discoveries
Naval magazine explosions